December is the tenth studio and first Christmas album by American singer-songwriter Kenny Loggins.  Released in 1998, it contains several Christmas music standards, such as "White Christmas" and "Have Yourself a Merry Little Christmas," along with several other lesser-known holiday songs (such as "Walking In The Air" from the television special "The Snowman"), as well as a few Loggins originals.
Musicians include  Peter Kater also the co-producer, Russ Kunkel, veteran
Loggins and Messina reed player Jon Clarke,  David Crosby and Graham Nash.

Track listing
 "Walking in the Air" (Howard Blake) – 5:23
 "The Christmas Song" (Mel Tormé, Robert Wells) – 4:34
 "The Bells of Christmas" (Kenny Loggins, Steve Wood) – 5:58
 "Coventry Carol" (Traditional) – 3:08
 "Christmas Time Is Here" (Vince Guaraldi, Lee Mendelson) – 5:03
 "Angels in the Snow" (Loggins, Julia Loggins, Wood) – 5:07
 "White Christmas" (Irving Berlin) – 3:53
 "Some Children See Him" (Alfred Burt, Wihla Hutson) – 4:58
 "On Christmas Morning" (David Foster, Loggins) – 4:11 
 "Have Yourself a Merry Little Christmas" (Ralph Blane, Hugh Martin) – 5:18
 "December" (Peter Kater, Loggins) – 5:38

Personnel 
 Kenny Loggins – lead vocals, guitars
 Dean Parks – guitars 
 Jai Winding – keyboards, synthesizers
 Raymond Cham – keyboard programming
 Marc Mann – additional programming 
 Peter Kater – acoustic piano (11)
 Larry Klein – bass (1, 3, 4, 6, 9)
 Larry Tuttle – string bass (1, 8)
 Jimmy Johnson – bass (2, 7, 10)
 Russ Kunkel – drums (3, 6, 9)
 Peter Asher – percussion (1, 3, 5, 6, 9, 10, 11)
 Michael Fisher – percussion (4, 11)
 Norton Buffalo – harmonica (5, 10)
 Jon Clarke – oboe (1, 3, 6), English horn (3), flute (6, 9, 11), recorder (6, 9, 11)
 Joseph Meyer – French horn (3, 9)
 Kazu Matsui – shakuhachi (4)
 Everette Harp – tenor saxophone (7), EWI controller (8)
 String Trio (1, 3, 11) – Stephanie Fife, Rogin Lorentz and Novi Novog
 David Rubenstein – string and woodwind arrangements, conductor
 Jamie Bower – recitation (1)
 Kate Price – backing vocals (2, 8, 10, 11), hammered dulcimer (4)
 Beth Wood – backing vocals (3), BGV arrangements (3)
 Steve Wood – backing vocals (3), BGV arrangements (3)
 David Crosby – backing vocals (4)
 Graham Nash – backing vocals (4)
 Valerie Carter – backing vocals (5)
 Kate Markowitz – backing vocals (5)
 Children's Choir (5) – Hillary Brooks, Amy Gleason, Jonathon Hall, Brandon Pollard, Ian Redford and Laurie Schillinger
 Luana Jackson – choir director (5)
 Mervyn Warren – backing vocals (6), BGV arrangements (6)

Musicians (Instrumental Interludes)
 Peter Kater – acoustic piano, synthesizers
 Geoffrey Gordon – percussion 
 R. Carlos Nakai – Native American flute
 David Darling – cello

Production 
 Kenny Loggins – producer
 Peter Asher – producer
 Peter Kater – producer (instrumental interludes), recording engineer (instrumental interludes)
 Ivy Skoff – production coordination
 Nathaniel Kunkel – recording engineer
 Ted Blaisdell – additional  engineer
 Bob Loftus – additional engineer
 Tony Shepperd – additional engineer
 Rob Brill – assistant engineer
 Mike Gillies – assistant engineer, digital editing
 John Nelson – assistant engineer
 Sean O'Dwyer – assistant engineer
 George Massenberg – mixing 
 Paul DeCarli – digital editing
 Doug Sax – mastering
 David Coleman – art direction, design
 Patrick Sagouspe – digital artwork 
 Jeremiah Sullivan – photography
 Boyd Harris – photo assistance
 Bil Zelman – photo assistance
 Jeff Schock – management

Studios
 Recorded at Plantation Mixing and Recording (Haiku, Maui, Hawaii); Conway Studios (Hollywood, CA); Jai Winding Productions (Los Angeles, CA); Saturn Sound (Studio City, CA); Master Tracks Recording; Oak Spring Studio.
 Mixed at Conway Studios.
 Mastered at The Mastering Lab (Hollywood, CA).

Kenny Loggins albums
1998 Christmas albums
Albums produced by Peter Asher
Christmas albums by American artists
Columbia Records Christmas albums
Pop rock Christmas albums